South Central Communications, Inc. d/b/a SCC Networks is a company owned by GRM Networks that provides local telephone service to communities in Iowa, including Murray, Lorimor, and Corydon.

The company's name refers to its location in south central Iowa.

The company was established in 1996 and was incorporated in Missouri. However, its operations are all located in Iowa.

References

Communications in Iowa
Telecommunications companies established in 1996
Telecommunications companies of the United States